Alex Brown (born 13 October 1989) is a rugby union player for Perpignan in the Top 14. He plays as a Prop.

Brown is a former member of the Saracens Academy, While a part of the Academy, Brown was dual registered with Bedford Blues to aid his development. Brown joined Doncaster in 2011. After establishing himself as a regular in the Doncaster side it was announced on 10 April 2012 that Brown and fellow Doncaster forward Jack Yeandle would be joining Aviva Premiership side Exeter Chiefs. Alex currently plays for the Rugby Pro D2 (french second division) team USA Perpignan.

References

External links
 Aviva Premiership Player Profile
 Exeter Chiefs Player Profile

Living people
1989 births
English rugby union players
Doncaster Knights players
Exeter Chiefs players
USA Perpignan players
People from Rochford
Rugby union players from Essex
Rugby union props